Wrightstown is the name of a number of communities in the United States, including:
 Wrightstown, New Jersey
 Wrightstown Township, Pennsylvania
 Wrightstown, Wisconsin
 Town of Wrightstown, Wisconsin